Koratagere is a Panchayat Town in Tumkur district in the Indian state of Karnataka.

Geography
Koratagere is a Town in Koratagere Taluk in Tumkur District in Karnataka State. . It has an average elevation of 750 metres (2460 feet).

Demographics
 India census, Koratagere had a population of15,265. Males constitute 51% of the population and females 49%. Koratagere has an average literacy rate of 71%, higher than the national average of 59.5%: male literacy is 77%, and female literacy is 65%. In Koratagere, 11% of the population is under 6 years of age.

References

Cities and towns in Tumkur district